The National Assembly is the lower house and main legislative political body of the Parliament of the Democratic Republic of the Congo. It was established by the 2006 constitution.

It is located at the People's Palace in Kinshasa.

The most recent National Assembly was sworn in on January 28, 2019.

Electoral system
The National Assembly is elected every five years by universal suffrage.  For the 2018 elections the 500 seats of the assembly were apportioned among 181 electoral districts based on voter registration numbers.  This resulted in 62 members elected in single member constituencies by first-past-the-post and the remaining 438 members elected in multi-member constituencies by open list.

Presidents of the National Assembly

Number of deputies for each constituency by province
The number of deputies elected from each subdivision in parenthesis.

Bas-Uele (7)
 City of Buta (1)
 Territories of Aketi (1), Ango (1), Bambesa (1), Bondo (1), Buta (1), Poko (1)

Équateur (12)
 City of Mbandaka (2)
 Territories of Basankusu (2), Bikoro (2), Bolomba (2), Bomongo (1), Ingende (1), Lukolela (1), Makanza (1)

Haut-Katanga (30)
 Cities of Lubumbashi (15), Likasi (3)
 Territories of Kambove (2), Kasenga (2), Kipushi (2), Mitwaba (1), Pweto (3), Sakania (2)

Haut-Lomami (16)
 City of Kamina (1)
 Territories of Bukama (4), Kabongo (3), Kamina (2), Kaniama (2), Malemba-Nkulu (4)

Haut-Uele (11)
 City of Isiro (1)
 Territories of Dungu (1), Faradje (2), Niangara (1), Rungu (1), Wamba (3), Watsa (2)

Ituri (28)
 City of Bunia (2)
 Territories of Aru (6), Djugu (7), Irumu (3), Mahagi (7), Mambasa (3)

Kasaï (19)
 City of Tshikapa (3)
 Territories of Dekese (1), Ilebo (3), Luebo (2), Mweka (3), Tshikapa (7)

Kasaï Central (19)
 City of Kananga (4)
 Territories of Demba (3), Dibaya (2), Dimbelenge (2), Kazumba (4), Luiza (4)

Kasaï-Oriental (14)
 City of Mbuji-Mayi (6)
 Territories of Kabeya-Kamwanga (1), Katanda (2), Lupatapata (1), Miabi (2),  Tshilenge (2)

Kinshasa (55)
 Kinshasa I (Lukunga) (14), Kinshasa II (Funa) (12), Kinshasa III (Mont-Amba) (11), Kinshasa IV (Tshangu) (18)

Kongo Central (24)
 Cities of Boma (2), Matadi (3)
 Territories of Kasangulu (2), Kimvula (1), Lukula (2), Luozi (1), Madimba (2),  Mbanza-Ngungu (4), Moanda (2), Seke-Banza (1), Songololo (2), Tshela (2)

Kwango (12)
 City of Kenge (1)
 Territories of Feshi (2), Kahemba (1), Kasongo-Lunda (4), Kenge (3), Popokabaka (1)

Kwilu (29)
 Cities of Bandundu (1),  Kikwit (3)
 Territories of Bagata (3), Bulungu (6), Gungu (4), Idiofa (7), Masi-Manimba (5)

Lomami (15)
 Cities of Kabinda (1), Mwene-Ditu  (2)
 Territories of Kabinda (2), Kamiji (1), Lubao (2), Luilu (4), Ngandajika (3)

Lualaba (13)
 City of Kolwezi (4)
 Territories of Dilolo (2), Kapanga (1), Lubudi (3),  Mutshatsha (2),  Sandoa (1)

Mai-Ndombe (12)
 City of Inongo (1)
 Territories of Bolobo (1), Inongo (2), Kiri (1), Kutu (3), Kwamouth (1), Mushie  (1), Oshwe (1), Yumbi (1)

Maniema (13)
 City of Kindu (2)
 Territories of Kabambare (2), Kailo (1), Kasongo (3), Kibombo (1), Lubutu (1), Pangi (2), Punia (1)

Mongala (12)
 City of Lisala (1)
 Territories of  Bongandanga (3), Bumba (5), Lisala (3)

Nord-Kivu (48)
 Cities of Beni (2), Butembo (4), Goma (5)
 Territories of Beni (8), Lubero (9), Masisi (8), Nyiragongo (2), Rutshuru (7), Walikale (3)

Nord-Ubangi  (8)
 City of Gbadolite (1)
 Territories of Bosobolo (1), Businga (3), Mobayi-Mbongo (1), Yakoma (2)

Sankuru (14)
 City of Lusambo (1)
 Territories of Katako-Kombe (3), Kole (2), Lodja (5), Lomela (1), Lubefu (1),  Lusambo (1)

Sud-Kivu (32)
 City of Bukavu (5)
 Territories of Fizi (4),  Idjwi (2), Kabare (4), Kalehe (4),  Mwenga (3), Shabunda (2), Uvira (4), Walungu (4)

Sud-Ubangi (16)
 Cities of Gemena (1), Zongo (1)
 Territories of Budjala (3), Gemena (5), Kungu (4), Libenge (2)

Tanganyika (15)
 City of Kalemie (2)
 Territories of Kabalo (1), Kalemie (2), Kongolo (3), Manono (3), Moba (3), Nyunzu (1)

Tshopo (16)
 City of Kisangani (5)
 Territories of Bafwasende (1), Banalia (1), Basoko (2), Isangi (3), Opala (1), Ubundu (2), Yahuma (1)

Tshuapa (10)
 City of Boende (1)
 Territories of Befale (1), Boende (1), Bokungu (2), Djolu (2), Ikela (2), Monkoto (1)

See also
 Transitional National Assembly of the Democratic Republic of the Congo
 List of presidents of the National Assembly of the Democratic Republic of the Congo
 Members of the National Assembly of the Democratic Republic of the Congo 2006-2011

References

External links
National Assembly of the Democratic Republic of the Congo

Government of the Democratic Republic of the Congo
Congo
1960 establishments in the Republic of the Congo (Léopoldville)